Westland Milk Products is a dairy company based in Hokitika, New Zealand. It has been owned by Chinese dairy company Yili Group since 2019. It is the third-equal largest dairy processor in New Zealand (behind Fonterra and Open Country Dairy, and tied with Synlait) with a 3.4% market share.

Milk is sourced from farms across the West Coast, as far north as Karamea and as far south as Haast, and from farms throughout Canterbury. Their major processing factory is located in Hokitika, with their main warehouse and milk concentration plant near Rolleston in Canterbury.

History
The Westland Co-operative Dairy Company Limited was formed in 1937 following the amalgamation of a number of small co-operatives within the Westland region including Kokatahi, Waitaha and part of the Arahura Dairy Companies.

Prior to the restructuring of the dairy industry in 2001, dairy products manufactured in New Zealand were marketed and exported by the New Zealand Dairy Board, which was jointly owned by all dairy companies. In 2001, the industry was deregulated and the New Zealand Dairy Group, Kiwi Co-operative Dairies and the New Zealand Dairy Board amalgamated to form Fonterra. Westland Milk Products shareholders elected not to participate in the amalgamation and so became a fully independent dairy company responsible for the sales and marketing of its own products.

In 2004, Westland launched their consumer butter brand Westgold.

In 2009, the Rolleston storage and sales and marketing office was established, and the site now also houses a Reverse Osmosis Plant and staff from many different business areas -  including Customer Service, IT, Finance, Supply Chain, People and Capability and Milk Collection.

In 2010, Westland acquired full ownership of EasiYo, a make-at-home yoghurt company based in Auckland
The following year, in 2011, milk collection from Canterbury shareholders began.

In 2012, Westland began manufacture of Infant nutritional products and launched their "Westpro Nutrition" range. This was closely followed, in 2013, by the construction of Dryer 7, a dedicated Infant and Toddler Nutritionals (ITN) plant.

In 2014, Westland opened their first offshore office in Shanghai, China

On 18 March 2019, China's Yili Group signed an agreement to acquire 100% equity of Westland Milk Products, subject to shareholder approval - which was overwhelmingly given on 4 July.

Products
Westland manufactures a variety of products derived from milk, ranging from commodity milk powders to infant nutrition products. The full range of products is as follows:

Ingredients 
 Skim milk powder 
 Whole milk powder
 Buttermilk powder 
 Milk protein concentrate
 Whey protein concentrate 
 Casein and caseinates
 Butter
 Anhydrous milk fat (AMF)

Bio-active 
 Lactoferrin
 Colostrum

Infant and toddler nutritionals  
 Stage 1 Infant Formula base
 Stage 2 Infant Formula base
 Stage 3 Infant Formula base

Organisational memberships
 New Zealand Co-operatives Association (Inc)
 Dairy Companies Association of New Zealand (DCANZ)
 Infant Nutrition council

Sites
Westland Milk Products has three sites worldwide.

 Headquarters in Hokitika, New Zealand, on the corner of Livingstone and Stafford Streets.
 In the industrial zone in Rolleston (23 kilometres south of Christchurch), on Westland Place.
 China office in the municipality of Changning in Shanghai, China

Quality management system
Westland Milk Products uses a quality management system known as Food Safety System Certification (FSSC) 22000 to monitor all aspects of its operations including milk collection, administration, stores and maintenance. An independent organization audits this system to an international standard.

Awards
Westland Milk Products has won a number of business and innovation awards.

In 2012, Westland Milk Products won the Ministry of Science and Innovation's Best Use of Research and Development category at the New Zealand International Business Awards. In the same year, Westland Milk Products was also named the Supreme Winner of the 2012 West Coast Lending Light Business Excellence Awards.

Four years later, Westland Milk Products was a finalist in the 2016 New Zealand International Business Awards for the Excellence in Design category. In March 2016, Westgold Unsalted Butter, a trademarked product of Westland Milk Products, won the prestigious Food for Chefs Champion Butter Award.

Community involvement
In 2016, Westland Milk Products partnered with the Westland District Council to fund the Blue Spur Water Treatment Plant Expansion Project. This project received a highly commended award in the Chorus Excellence Award for Best Practice in Infrastructure Management.

Westland Milk Products sponsors Ronald McDonald House, Federated Farmers, The Canterbury West Coast Air Rescue Trust, as well as numerous Hockey, Netball, Rugby Union, Basketball and Rugby League junior sports clubs in the Buller, Grey and Westland Districts of the West Coast. Additionally, Westland Milk Products has formerly been a sponsor of the West Coast Penguin Trust.

References

External links
 

Dairy products companies of New Zealand
Food and drink companies established in 1937
Hokitika
2019 mergers and acquisitions
New Zealand subsidiaries of foreign companies
New Zealand companies established in 1937
Rolleston, New Zealand